The Coalition for Comprehensive Immigration Reform (CCIR), also known as CCIR/NAOC or New American Opportunity Campaign (NAOC) is a non-profit immigrant rights advocacy organization based in Washington, DC, established in 2003 to pass comprehensive immigration reform. It was instrumental in the 2004 Immigrant Workers Freedom Ride, modeled after the Freedom Rides of the Civil Rights Movement and acts as an umbrella organization for a number of national and local immigrant rights organizations for advocacy and coalition building.

The New American Opportunity Campaign was a campaign launched by CCIR in 2004. Soon, the campaign became the core project of the coalition and NAOC became a better known name than CCIR. CCIR consolidated its identity into the single "Coalition for Comprehensive Immigration Reform" name in 2007.

Board of directors

 Deepak Bhargava, Center for Community Change
 Cecilia Muñoz, National Council of La Raza
 Frank Sharry, America's Voice
 Chung-Wha Hong, New York Immigration Coalition
 Eliseo Medina, Service Employees International Union (SEIU)
 Tom Snyder, UNITE HERE

External links
 Official Website
 Immigrant Workers Freedom Ride 2004
 Atlantic Philanthropies

Organizations established in 2003
Non-profit organizations based in Washington, D.C.
Civic and political organizations of the United States
Immigration political advocacy groups in the United States